Nəcəfqulubəyli (also, Nəcəfqulubəli, Nadzhafkulibeyli, Nadzhafkulubeyli, and Nadzhafulibeyli) is a village and municipality in the Aghjabadi Rayon of Azerbaijan.  It has a population of 1,060.

References 

Populated places in Aghjabadi District